Oxyptilus wallecei is a moth of the family Pterophoridae. It was described by Thomas Bainbrigge Fletcher in 1911 and is found on the Aru Islands in Indonesia.

References

Moths described in 1911
Oxyptilini